Estonia is competing at the 2022 European Athletics Championships in Munich, Germany, between 15 and 21 August 2022. A delegation of 12 athletes were sent to represent the country.

Medallists

Results

Men
Track and road events

 Field events

Combined events – Decathlon

Women
Track and road events

 Field events

See also
Estonia at the 2022 European Championships

References

External links
European Athletics Championships

Nations at the 2022 European Athletics Championships
European Championships in Athletics
2022